Anna Maria Monticelli is an Australian actress, screenwriter and producer.

Monticelli won the 1994 AFI Award for Best Actress in a Supporting Role for her role in Silver City. In 2001 she was nominated for the AFI Award for Best Original Screenplay for La Spagnola. At the 2008 Australian Writers Guild awards she won the best feature film adaptation for her screenplay of J. M. Coetzee's Disgrace. At the Film Critics Circle of Australia Awards she won the 2010 Award for Best Screenplay for Disgrace and was nominated for Best Film in 2010 (producer) for Disgrace and for Best Screenplay - Original in 2002 for La Spagnola.

Monticelli is married to actor and director Steve Jacobs who directed La Spagnola and Disgrace.

Filmography

FILM

TELEVISION

Writing
La Spagnola (2001)
Disgrace (2008)

Producer
La Spagnola (2001)
Disgrace (2008)

References

External links
 

Australian television actresses
Australian film actresses
Living people
Year of birth missing (living people)